Tursun may refer to the following notable people:
Given name
Tursun Beg, 15th century Ottoman bureaucrat and historian
Tursun Uljabayev (1916–1988), Tajikistani politician

Surname
Fatma Özlem Tursun (born 1988), Turkish football referee and former player
Mihrigul Tursun (born 1989), is Uyghur detainee in China
Perhat Tursun (born 1969), Uyghur writer and poet
Sanubar Tursun (born 1971), Uyghur singer-songwriter